The Abelard School is an academically rigorous private school in Toronto, Ontario, Canada that was named after the 12th century French theologian, scholar and philosopher Peter Abélard. Its teaching philosophy is based on the Socratic method.

History
The school was founded in 1997 by a group of four teachers: Brian Blair, Michelle Lefolii, Shai Maharaj, and Alina Rossinsky. In September 2006, The Abelard School moved to a location near the University of Toronto. In 2017, The Abelard School moved to a new location at 557 Church St, at Church and Wellesley.

Organization
The school has a yearly enrollment of around 50 students educated by seven full-time faculty members, and several part-time faculty members, all of whom have advanced degrees in their field.

The school follows an accelerated curriculum, with students taking courses above their grade level. The courses run the full academic year.

Education
The school educates in grades 7–12 and prepares pupils for the Ontario Secondary School Diploma and teaches the ministry requirements. Class sizes range between one and fifteen students. Advanced Placement (AP) courses are offered to students who excel in certain areas, and who consistently achieve outstanding results in the subject area. Some students choose to stay an extra year (commonly referred to at the Abelard School as 'grade thirteen') in order improve their grades and/or take more courses.

In addition to the standard mandatory French language class in grade nine, students must take French in grade ten. In a similar vein, Latin is also a mandatory course for grade nine students. Grade nine students also take a Foundation Studies in the Sciences course, which covers both grade nine and ten science, and which emphasizes the interconnections between all the scientific fields, instead of simply taking a single grade nine science course. Students attend classes at grades relevant to their level of attainment rather than simple chronology.

Abelard students have received top-tier scholarships, including the Loran Scholarship, the Blyth Cambridge Trust Scholarship, the Schulich Leaders Scholarship, and the University of Toronto National Scholarship. Two alumni have received the Thiel Fellowship.

Alumni 
 Vitalik Buterin, co-founder of Ethereum, attended the school from grades nine through twelve.
 Noam Sienna, academic, sofer, and author
 Kay Gabriel, academic based at New York University

References

External links

 

High schools in Toronto
Private schools in Toronto
Educational institutions established in 1997
1997 establishments in Ontario